Bharya Athra Pora is a 2013 Malayalam family film directed by Akku Akbar, starring Jayaram and Gopika in the lead roles. The cast and crew of 2008 film  Veruthe Oru Bharya came together to make the film, although it is not a sequel to the first film. The film was a commercial success.

Plot
Satyanathen is a teacher at Vivekodayam school, Thrissur. His wife Priya is a bank employee and they have a fourteen-year-old son Bhaskaran. Satyanathan is an alcoholic. After school hours, he can be seen with his friends in the local bar or at thekkinkad maithanam where they play cards. He is dissatisfied with his life and wife. He befriends some young men of the new generation whose lifestyle tempts him. During an outing to a beach he reveals to his newly formed friends that he is in love with a girl called Neena Kuruvila whose thoughts and personality match with his. Priya learns of this while logging on to his Facebook account without his knowledge. She then tells her close friends, who suggest she take him to a rehabilitation center. But Priya decides that she is not interested in taking any experiments and that she is disgusted with his behaviour. She files a joint petition for divorce and both sign it. They decide to live separately until the six months given by court to settle for their divorce. Satyanathen decides to live on first floor and Priya lives in ground floor with Bhaskaran. After some time, he notices a man dropping by to see Priya everyday and he becomes jealous. One day Neena decides to meet Satyanathen at beach side. She asked for 4 lakh rupees as help and flirts with him. But he adjusts and gives her that money not realizing it's a trap. Later on Satyanathen realizes that she is fake and had been taking money from many men outside and doing illicit affairs when the news about a raid flashes on TV. Bhaskaran has been telling the flashback to a doctor while he collapsed after running from police. He had sex with his mentally disabled female friend recorded and saved it in a pendrive. Priya discovers that her son is a porn addict and Sathyanathen also finds it and thrashes him. Finally Dr Augustine brings Bhaskaran back to his home where he sees his friend Neha and breaks down. Satyanathen consoles him. Later on at the Family court, Priya and Satyanathen get divorced and expects them to change while living in the same house but separately. At the end of the movie Satyanathen and his son Bhaskaran takes an oath that they will change for good and Priya will return to them.

Cast
 Jayaram as Sathyanadhan Nair
 Gopika as Priya Sathyanadhan
 Master Ajai as Bhaskaran Sathyanadhan / Bhas
 Aju Varghese as Jilan
 Sanju Sivram
 Balachandran Chullikkad as Rajendran
 Molly Kannamally as Thandamma
 Siddique as Dr. Rahman
 Sunil Sukhada as Principal
 Jayaraj Warrier as Sathyanathan Nair's friend
 Anwar Sherif as Jilan's friend 
 Majeed as Dr. Augustine
 Sivaji Guruvayoor as Advocate
 Reena Basheer as Zeenath
 Ambika Mohan as Family Court Judge

References

External links
 

Indian sequel films
2010s Malayalam-language films
Films shot in Thrissur